Red Snow is a 2021 American horror comedy film directed by Sean Nichols Lynch. The film stars Dennice Cisneros as a supernatural romance author living in Lake Tahoe who comes into conflict with vampires over the Christmas holidays. The film had its international premiere at London FrightFest on August 26, 2021 and was released on December 28, 2021.

Plot
Struggling vampire romance novelist Olivia Romo is spending her Christmas holidays alone at her deceased mother's cabin in Lake Tahoe. One night, an injured bat slams against her window. Olivia takes the wounded animal inside her garage to nurse it back to health. The next morning, Olivia is surprised to discover that the bat has transformed into a handsome vampire named Luke.

Olivia stocks up on pig's blood from the local butcher to feed her new house guest and soon the weakened vampire is up on his feet and talking. The unlikely companions get to know each other and start to form a tenuous friendship, but Olivia grows suspicious of Luke's intentions as his past begins to catch up with him.

Vampire hunter Julius King visits Olivia posing as a private investigator and tells her he's looking for a trio of dangerous criminals, one of them being Luke. Olivia covers for Luke, but King sees right through her lies. He attempts to seize Luke by force, only to be killed in the process.

Luke attempts to mend his shaky relationship with Olivia by giving her feedback on her book. Just as he's gotten back into her good graces, his vampire friends Jackie and Brock arrive on the scene, implying that he's strayed too far from his ruthless vampire roots and must kill Olivia.

Jackie and Brock invade Olivia's home on Christmas Eve and Olivia barely escapes with her life in King's abandoned SUV. While the vampires go on a late night killing spree, Olivia learns the horrible truth about Luke's past from King's records. Olivia calls one of King's associates, Simon, who advises her not to attempt to deal with the dangerous vampires herself. Nevertheless, on Christmas morning, Olivia returns to her cabin and fights the vampires, killing Brock and Jackie by impaling them through the heart. Olivia then shoots Luke with a crossbow, seemingly killing him as well.

Ten months later, Olivia is a successful author of vampire fiction. Following a book signing in Los Angeles, Olivia returns to her cabin where she has imprisoned the barely living Luke in her garage, forcing him to be her muse in exchange for blood.

Cast
Dennice Cisneros as Olivia Romo
Nico Bellamy as Luke
Laura Kennon as Jackie
Vernon Wells as Julius King
Alan Silva as Brock
Edward Ewell as Simon

Production
While developing the project, Lynch took inspiration from some of his favorite vampire films such as Fright Night and The Lost Boys. He wrote the characters of Olivia and Luke specifically for Cisneros and Bellamy respectively. Other roles were cast in the San Francisco Bay Area. The film was shot on location in Lake Tahoe over the course of 12 shooting days with an additional day of shooting at a bookstore in Berkeley, California.

Release
The film premiered at Panic Fest, a horror/genre film festival in Kansas City, Missouri, on April 14, 2021. It went on to screen at film festivals around the world throughout 2021, including London FrightFest, New York City Horror Film Festival, GenreBlast, and Buenos Aires Rojo Sangre.

The film was released through various video-on-demand services in the United Kingdom, Ireland, Australia, New Zealand, Sweden, Norway, Denmark, Finland and Korea on December 6, 2021. The film received a DVD and video-on-demand release in the United States on December 28, 2021.

Reception
The film has  approval rating based on  critic reviews on Rotten Tomatoes. Martin Unsworth of Starburst rated the film 4/5 stars and praised the performance of Cisneros, saying "her wide-eyed wonder at meeting a real vampire is infectious, and she carries the role beautifully." In a negative review, Cath Clarke of The Guardian criticized the film's comedic tone, saying "it's a black comedy with some silly splattery gore."

The film won both the Audience Award and Best Horror/Thriller Feature at the 2021 GenreBlast Film Festival, as well as Best On-Screen Duo for Cisneros and Bellamy. At the Sacramento Horror Film Festival, it won the Best Feature prize while the New York City Horror Film Festival named the film Best Horror Comedy Feature of its 2021 edition. For her performance as Olivia Romo, Cisneros was awarded Best Actress in a Feature Film in the International Competition at Buenos Aires Rojo Sangre in Argentina and the Masque Rouge award for Best Performance at the Portland Horror Film Festival.

References

External links

2021 independent films
2021 comedy horror films
2021 horror thriller films
2020s Christmas horror films
American comedy horror films
American independent films
American vampire films
American Christmas horror films
American Christmas comedy films
Vampire comedy films
2020s English-language films
2020s American films